Puttad is a village in KoyilandyTaluk near Perambra in Kozhikode district, Kerala, India.

Economy
People here are mainly engaged in agriculture such as paddy, banana and tapioca. Coconut farming also is a major source of income. Many people from Puttad work abroad.

Educational institutions
Schools
Puttad G.L.P School
Nochat Higher Secondary School
Valoor G.U.P School

Places of interest
Sree. Cherukunnu Thalachilon-Paradevatha Temple
Cherukashi Shiva Temple
Sree Muthappan Temple, Valoor

Transportation
Puttad village connects to other parts of India through Koyilandy town. The nearest airports are at Kannur and Kozhikode. The nearest railway station is at Koyiandy. The national highway no. 66 passes through Koyilandy and the northern stretch connects to Mangalore, Goa and Mumbai. The southern stretch connects to Cochin and Trivandrum. The eastern National Highway No.54 going through Kuttiady connects to Mananthavady, Mysore and Bangalore.

References

Koyilandy area
Villages in Kozhikode district